This is a list of patiences, which are card games that are also referred to as solitaires or as card solitaire. 

This list is not intended to be exhaustive, but only includes games that have met the usual Wikipedia requirements (e.g. notability).  Additions should only be made if there is an existing entry on Wikipedia that they can be linked to. To avoid duplicate pages being created, alternative titles and the names of variants are listed separately (except titles that include little more than the name of the parent game). 

Games of the patience genre played by more than one player are marked with a plus (+) sign.

A
 Accordion
 Aces and Kings
 Aces Square 
 Aces Up 
 Acme
 Addiction
 Agnes
 Alaska
 Algerian
 Alhambra
 Amazons
 American Toad
 Apophis
 Appreciate
 Acquaintance
 Archway
 Auld Lang Syne 
 Australian Patience

B
 Babette
 Backbone
 Baker's Dozen
 Baker's Game
 Baroness
 Batsford
 Beetle
 Beleaguered Castle
 Belvedere
 Betsy Ross
 Big Ben
 Big Forty 
 Big Harp
 Birthday
 Bisley
 Black Hole 
 Block 10
 Blockade
 Bowling Solitaire
 Box Kite
 Braid
 Brigade
 Bristol
 British Constitution
 British Square
 Broken Intervals
 Busy Aces

C
 Calculation
 Canfield
 Capricieuse
 Carpet
 Carthage
 Casket
 Castles in Spain
 Chameleon
 Chessboard
 Cicely
 Citadel
 Clock Patience
 Colorado
 Colours
 Concentration
 Congress
 Contradance
 Corner Card
 Corner Patience
 Corners
 Corona
 Constitution
 Cotillion
 Crapette+ 
 Courtyard
 Crazy Quilt
 Crescent
 Cribbage Solitaire
 Cribbage Squares
 Cruel
 Curds and Whey
 Czarina

D
 Decade
 Deuces
 Devil's Grip
 Diplomat
 Double Canfield
 Double Klondike+ 
 Double Solitaire+ 
 Doublets
 Downing Street
 Dress Parade
 Duchess

E
 Eagle Wing
 Easthaven
 Eight Cards
 Eight Off
 Eighteens
 Elevens
 Emperor
 Emperor of Germany
 Escalator
 Exit

F
 Faerie Queen
 Fifteens
 Five Piles
 Florentine Patience
 Flower Garden
 Fly
 Following
 Fortress
 Fortune's Favor
 Forty Thieves
 Four Corners
 Four Seasons
 Four Winds
 Fourteen Out
 Fourteens 
 FreeCell
 Frog
 Frustration

G
 Gaps
 Gargantua
 Gate
 Gavotte
 Gay Gordons
 German Clock
 German Patience
 Giant
 Giza
 Glencoe
 Golf
 Good Measure
 Good Thirteen
 Grampus
 Granada
 Grand Duchess
 Grandfather's Clock
 Grandfather's Patience
 Grandmother's Patience

H
 Harp
 Heads And Tails
 Herring-Bone
 Herz zu Herz
 Hide-and-Seek
 Hit or Miss
 House in the Woods
 House on the Hill

I
 Idiot's Delight
 Imaginary Thirteen
 Imperial Guards
 Indian
 Indian Carpet
 Interregnum
 Intrigue

J
 Josephine
 Jubilee

K
 King Albert
 King Tut
 Kings in the Corners
 King's Audience
 Kingsdown Eights
 Klondike
 Knockout

L
 La Belle Lucie
 La Chatelaine
 La Croix d'Honneur
 Labyrinth
 Lady Betty
 Lady of the Manor
 Laggard Lady
 Las Vegas Solitaire
 Last Chance
 Laying Siege
 Leoni's Own
 Limited
 Little Milligan
 Little Spider
 Little Windmill
 Long Braid
 Lovely Lucy
 Louis
 Lucas

M
 Maria
 Martha
 Matrimony
 Maze
 Memory
 Millie
 Milligan Cell
 Milligan Harp
 Milligan Yukon
 Miss Milligan
 Montana
 Monte Carlo
 Moojub
 Mount Olympus
 Mrs. Mop

N
 Narcotic
 Napoleon at St Helena 
 Napoleon's Favorite
 Napoleon's Square
 Nerts+  
 Nestor
 Nine Across
 Ninety-One
 Nivernaise (La Nivernaise)
 Number Ten
 Numerica

O
 Odd and Even
 Old Fashioned
 Old Mole
 Old Patience
 One234
 Osmosis

P
 Päckchen
 Pairs
 Parallels
 Parisienne (La Parisienne, Parisian)
 Parliament
 Pas de Deux
 Patience
 Patriarchs
 Penguin
 Perpetual Motion
 Perseverance
 Persian Patience
 Persian Rug
 Pharaoh′s Grave
 Picture Gallery
 Picture Patience
 Pigtail
 Plait
 Poker Squares
 Portuguese Solitaire
 Precedence (Order of Precedence)
 Propeller
 Puss in the Corner
 Putt Putt
 Pyramid
 Pyramide
 Pyramid Golf

Q
 Quadrille
 Queen of Italy
 Queen's Audience

R
 Racing Demon+  
 Raglan
 Rainbow Canfield
 Rank and File
 Red and Black
 Roosevelt at San Juan
 Rosamund's Bower
 Rouge et Noir
 Royal Cotillion
 Royal Flush
 Royal Marriage
 Royal Parade
 Royal Rendezvous
 Russian Bank+ 
 Russian

S
 Salic Law
 Scorpion
 Seahaven Towers 
 Seven Devils
 Sham Battle
 Shamrocks
 Simple Simon
 Simplicity
 Sir Tommy
 Six By Six
 Sixes and Sevens
 Sixty Thieves
 Sly Fox
 Solitaire
 Spaces
 Spanish Patience
 Spider
 Spiderette
 Spiderwort
 Spit+ 
 Square
 St. Helena
 Stalactites
 Stonewall
 Storehouse
 Strategy
 Streets
 Streets and Alleys
 Stronghold
 Sultan
 Super Flower Garden
 Superior Canfield

T
 Tableau
 Take Fourteen
 Tam O'Shanter
 Tens
 Terrace
 The Clock
 The Fan
 The Plot
 Thirteens
 Thirteen Up
 Thirteen Down
 Three Blind Mice
 Three Shuffles and a Draw
 Thumb and Pouch
 Tournament
 Tower of Hanoy (Tower of Hanoi)
 Tower of Pisa
 Travellers
 Trefoil
 Triangle
 Tri Peaks
 Tut's Tomb
 Twenty

V
 Vanishing Cross
 Vertical
 Virginia Reel

W
 Washington's Favorite
 Wasp
 Watch
 Weavers
 Westcliff
 Whitehead
 Wildflower
 Will o' the Wisp
 Windmill

X

Y
 Yukon

Z
 Zodiac

Software patience or solitaire games 
This is a very select list of particularly notable and influential examples of software dedicated to solitaire games:
 Solitaire Royale (1987)
 Microsoft Solitaire (1990), Microsoft FreeCell (1991), and Microsoft Spider Solitaire (1998)
 Hoyle's Official Book of Games: Volume 2 (1990)
 Eric's Ultimate Solitaire (1993)
 PySol (1998)
 Soltrio Solitaire (2007)

See also 
 List of card games
 Glossary of patience and solitaire terms